Joseph Macdonald, K C (January 14, 1863 – February 16, 1942) was a lawyer, magistrate and political figure in Nova Scotia, Canada. He represented Cape Breton Centre from 1925 to 1933 and Cape Breton North from 1933 to 1937 as a Conservative member.

He was born in Sydney Mines, Nova Scotia, the son of Michael and Catherine Macdonald. He was educated at the University of Ottawa and Dalhousie University. In 1893, he married Teresa Mary MacDonald. Macdonald served as military censor during World War I. He was a member of the Executive Council of Nova Scotia from 1931 to 1933. He died in North Sydney at the age of 79.

His son John Michael Macdonald served in the Nova Scotia House of Assembly, 1956–1960 and the Senate of Canada, 1960–1997.

References 
 
 McDonell, JK Lords of the North (1997) 

1863 births
1942 deaths
Dalhousie University alumni
Members of the Executive Council of Nova Scotia
People from the Cape Breton Regional Municipality
Progressive Conservative Association of Nova Scotia MLAs
University of Ottawa alumni